TB
This is a list of the busiest airports in the Post-Soviet states (handling more than 1,000,000 passengers per year), ranked by total passengers per year, including both terminal and transit passengers. Data is from provisional sources.

The tables also show the percentage change in total passengers for each airport over the last year. Data is sourced individually for each airport and normally originates from national aviation authority statistics, or those of the airport operator.

In graph

2022 statistics

2021 statistics 

The political status of Crimea is the subject of a political and territorial dispute between Russia and Ukraine. The Crimean Peninsula was annexed by the Russian Federation in February–March 2014. In 2016, UN General Assembly reaffirmed non-recognition of the annexation and condemned "the temporary occupation of part of the territory of Ukraine—the Autonomous Republic of Crimea and the city of Sevastopol".

2020 statistics

2019 statistics 

The political status of Crimea is the subject of a political and territorial dispute between Russia and Ukraine. The Crimean Peninsula was annexed by the Russian Federation in February–March 2014. In 2016, UN General Assembly reaffirmed non-recognition of the annexation and condemned "the temporary occupation of part of the territory of Ukraine—the Autonomous Republic of Crimea and the city of Sevastopol".

2018 statistics 

The political status of Crimea is the subject of a political and territorial dispute between Russia and Ukraine. The Crimean Peninsula was annexed by the Russian Federation in February–March 2014. In 2016, UN General Assembly reaffirmed non-recognition of the annexation and condemned "the temporary occupation of part of the territory of Ukraine—the Autonomous Republic of Crimea and the city of Sevastopol".

2017 statisttics 

The political status of Crimea is the subject of a political and territorial dispute between Russia and Ukraine.

2016 statistics 

The political status of Crimea is the subject of a political and territorial dispute between Russia and Ukraine.

2015 statistics 

The political status of Crimea is the subject of a political and territorial dispute between Russia and Ukraine.

2014 statistics 

The political status of Crimea is the subject of a political and territorial dispute between Russia and Ukraine. The Crimean Peninsula was annexed by the Russian Federation in February–March 2014. In 2016, UN General Assembly reaffirmed non-recognition of the annexation and condemned "the temporary occupation of part of the territory of Ukraine—the Autonomous Republic of Crimea and the city of Sevastopol".

2013 statistics

See also 
 List of the busiest airports in Armenia
 List of the busiest airports in Ukraine

References 

USSR
.
Airports, Busiest
Airports USSR
USSR